Spodnja Korena is a settlement in the Municipality of Duplek in northeastern Slovenia. It lies on the southwestern edge of the Slovene Hills southeast of Maribor. The area is part of the traditional region of Styria. The municipality is now included in the Drava Statistical Region.

A site of a Roman-era limestone quarry has been identified near the settlement.

References

External links
Spodnja Korena at Geopedia

Populated places in the Municipality of Duplek